Reginald Alfred Chester (21 November 1904 – 24 April 1977) was an English footballer who played as a forward. Born in Long Eaton, Derbyshire, he played in the Football League for Aston Villa, Manchester United, Huddersfield Town and Darlington.

References

Profile at MUFCInfo.com

1904 births
1977 deaths
People from Long Eaton
Footballers from Derbyshire
English footballers
Association football forwards
Aston Villa F.C. players
Manchester United F.C. players
Huddersfield Town A.F.C. players
Darlington F.C. players
English Football League players